A bank holiday is a national public holiday in the United Kingdom, Republic of Ireland and the Crown Dependencies. The term refers to all public holidays in the United Kingdom, be they set out in statute, declared by royal proclamation or held by convention under common law.

The term "bank holiday" refers to the fact that banking institutions typically close for business on such holidays, as they once used to do on certain saint's days.

List of current holidays

Notes

See also
 List of holidays by country
 Bank Holidays Act 1871
 Proposed St David's Day bank holiday

References

External links
 UK bank holidays
 Scotland Bank Holidays - Scottish Government

 Public holidays (Ireland)

Public holidays in the United Kingdom
Irish culture